Boris Dralyuk (born in 1982) is a Ukrainian-American writer, editor and translator. He obtained his high school degree from Fairfax High School and his PhD in Slavic Languages and Literatures from UCLA. He teaches in the English Department at the University of Tulsa. He has taught Russian literature at his alma mater and at the University of St Andrews, Scotland. From 2016 to 2022, he was executive editor and editor-in-chief of the Los Angeles Review of Books and he is the managing editor of Cardinal Points. 

His writings have appeared in numerous outlets such as Times Literary Supplement, New Yorker, New York Review of Books, London Review of Books, Paris Review, Granta, World Literature Today, etc. A specialist in the history of noir fiction, he has written introductions to the reissued works of Raoul Whitfield. 

In 2022, Dralyuk published his debut poetry collection My Hollywood and Other Poems with Paul Dry Books. It was reviewed positively by Anahid Neressian in The New York Review of Books, who remarked that an "air of upbeat sorrow permeates My Hollywood. It’s an émigré mood, defined by the conviction that things could always be worse."

Bibliography

Translations 

 Polina Barskova – The Zoo in Winter: Selected Poems (Melville House, 2011) 
 Dariusz Sośnicki – The World Shared (BOA Editions, 2014) 
 Oleg Woolf – Bessarabian Stamps: Stories (Phoneme Media, 2015) 
 Isaac Babel – Red Cavalry (Pushkin Press, 2015)
 Isaac Babel – Odessa Stories (Pushkin Press, 2016)
 Lev Ozerov – Portraits Without Frames (NYRB Classics, 2018)
 Mikhail Zoshchenko – Sentimental Tales (Columbia University Press, 2018)
 Leo Tolstoy – Lives and Deaths: Essential Stories (Pushkin Press, 2019) 
 Igor Golomstock – A Ransomed Dissident: A Life in Art Under the Soviets (I.B. Tauris, 2019)
 Maxim Osipov – Rock, Paper, Scissors, and Other Stories (NYRB Classics, 2019, with Alex Fleming and Anne Marie Jackson)
 Andrey Kurkov – Grey Bees (MacLehose Press, 2020; Deep Vellum, 2022)
 Alexander Pushkin – Peter the Great's African: Experiments in Prose (NYRB Classics, 2022, with Robert and Elizabeth Chandler)
 Maxim Osipov – Kilometer 101 (NYRB Classic, 2022, with Nicolas Pasternak Slater and Alex Fleming)

Poetry 

 My Hollywood and Other Poems (Paul Dry Books, 2022)

Monograph 

 Western Crime Fiction Goes East: The Russian Pinkerton Craze 1907-1934 (Brill, 2012)

Anthologies 

 1917: Stories and Poems from the Russian Revolution (Pushkin Press, 2016)
 The Penguin Book of Russian Poetry (Penguin Classics, 2015, co-edited with Robert Chandler and Irina Mashinski)

References

American translators
Living people
1982 births
Writers from Odesa
Writers from Los Angeles
Jewish humorists